Herrick Center is an unincorporated community in Susquehanna County, Pennsylvania, United States. Herrick Center had a post office until January 3, 2004; it still has its own ZIP code, 18430.

References

Unincorporated communities in Susquehanna County, Pennsylvania
Unincorporated communities in Pennsylvania